Adolf Meyer may refer to:
Adolf Bernhard Meyer (1840–1911), German anthropologist and ornithologist
Adolf Meyer (psychiatrist) (1866–1950), Swiss psychiatrist
Adolf Meyer (architect) (1881–1929), German architect

See also
Adolf Mayer (1843–1942), German chemist
Adolph de Meyer (1868–1946), photographer